Neanderthal, or Neandertal, was a species of the genus Homo that inhabited Europe and parts of western Asia.

Other articles about Neanderthals
 Neandertal, a valley near Düsseldorf, Germany, famous for the discovery of the first found Neanderthal in 1856
 Neanderthal 1, the skull found in Neandertal in 1856
 Neanderthal genetics
 Neanderthal extinction
 Neanderthal anatomy
 Neanderthal Museum, in Mettmann, Germany
 Neanderthal genome project
 Neanderthals in Gibraltar
 List of Neanderthal fossils
 List of Neanderthal sites
 Neanderthals in Southwest Asia
 Krapina Neanderthal site

Other uses
 Neanderthal (novel), a 1996 novel by John Darnton
 Neanderthal (album), a 2008 album of Danish band Spleen United

See also
 Neanderthal man (disambiguation) 
 Neanderthals in popular culture
 Joachim Neander